The William Chapline House in Sharpsburg, Maryland, United States is a large stone house built about 1790. The house has shaped stonework at the front and rubble stonework on the sides with a cast-iron porch added around the turn of the twentieth century. The house was damaged during the Battle of Antietam, when it was hit with canister shot. At that time it was occupied by Dr. Augustin A. Biggs, who treated the wounded from the battle in the house.

William Chapline House was listed on the National Register of Historic Places in 1976.

References

External links
, including photo in 1974, at Maryland Historical Trust

Houses completed in 1790
Houses on the National Register of Historic Places in Maryland
Houses in Washington County, Maryland
National Register of Historic Places in Washington County, Maryland